Feni Government College is a traditional higher education institute of Feni District of Bangladesh. It is one of the oldest educational institutions in southeastern Bengal. It is located in the heart of Feni City.

History
In 1918, various initiatives were taken to establish the college. In 1922, Khan Bahadur Bazlul Huq constituted a trustee board and since then the college was originally started. The member of this college birth of the first governing bodies were Khan Bahadur Abdul Aziz, Khan Saheb Maulabhi Bajlul Haque, Maulvi Abdul Khaliq, Maulvi Hasan Ali, Maulvi Abdus Sattar, Sarbaprayata Sriramani Mohan Goswami, Mahendra Kumar Ghosh, Kalicarana Nath, Shandip Roy,  Sriguru Das Kor, Srikalijaya Chakraborty, Inayat Hazari, Birendra Bhattacharjee and Ambikacharan Rakkhit Roy Bahadu. The first chairman of this committee was Akramuzzaman Khan who was the sub-divisional officer of Feni and the first secretary of this committee was Maulvi Abdul Khaleq.

Finance and land acquisition

Feni College was established in the Feni region. At that time, Tk 20,000 was raised locally in the first phase. After the Noakhali district board to 50 thousand Tk, Calcutta inmate Feni amiragamora overload Candricarana Saha gave the 4 thousand Tk, District overload Kumar Arun Chandra Singh Bahadur, gave two thousand Tk, Sattendra Chandra Ghosh 1 thousand Tk, Lakshmipur Sahesta the landlord Pyarilala Roy Chowdhury passed the five hundred Tk,  Chandra Kumar Chowdhury, the zamindar family of Banspara family of Feni gave 1 thousand taka. Old Harjari house of Feni donated some land and money. The college's activities started at the annual gift of Feni High School (Tk. Later, some of the khas lands and private land surrounding the college were included in the donation and purchase sources. The current college size is 9.25 acres (6.5 acres in Feni mound, 3 acres in Faleshwar Mouza). The journey of this college started with a college building, a Hindu and a Muslim hostel on both sides of the pond. Since its inception, the college is free from all financial problems of student support and student wages. On 10 August 1926 the then British India, His Excellency the Governor, Sir Hugh, who stiphenasana Lansdowne CI, SI CS College, was inaugurated two-storey main building.

Alumni
 Muhammad Shamsul Huq, Bangladeshi academic and former Minister of Foreign Affairs
 Selim Al Deen, playwright

References

Feni District
Educational institutions established in 1922
Colleges in Feni District
Universities and colleges in Feni District
1922 establishments in British India